Vriesea hydrophora is a plant species in the genus Vriesea.

The bromeliad is endemic to the Atlantic Forest biome (Mata Atlantica Brasileira), located in southeastern Brazil.

References
 

hydrophora
Endemic flora of Brazil
Flora of the Atlantic Forest